Russell Goldfield Jack AM (born 13 January 1935) is the founder of the Golden Dragon Museum.

Russell was born in Bendigo, Victoria, Australia, to herbalist, Harry Louey Jack and Gladys May. He attended Long Gully Primary School and Bendigo Technical College. He went to work on the Victorian Railways as a boilermaker and also ran a Chinese restaurant. He carried the Olympic torch through Bendigo for both the 1956 Melbourne Olympics and the 2000 Sydney Olympics. On 18 October 1958, he married Margaret Joan Clarke, with whom he had two children, David and Anita Jack. He has received numerous awards for his work within the Bendigo Chinese community and with the Golden Dragon Museum. He was named Victorian Senior Citizen of the Year in 1998. In 1993, Russell was gazetted as a Member of the Order of Australia in the 1993 Queen's Birthday Honours list for preservation of Bendigo's Chinese heritage. In 2008 he received an Award for Meritorious Service in the Community, Victorian Awards for Excellence in Multicultural Affairs. He has been involved with the Bendigo Chinese Association for most of his life and served as president for 32 years.

References

1935 births
Living people
Australian people of Chinese descent